Daniel Campos is a province in the north-western parts of the Bolivian Potosí Department. It is named after the poet Daniel Campos who originated from this area. The capital of the province is Llica.

Location
Daniel Campos province is one of sixteen provinces in the Potosí Department. It is located between 19° 25' and 20° 50' South and between 66° 49' and 68° 47' West. It borders Oruro Department in the north, the Republic of Chile in the west, Nor Lípez Province in the south, and Antonio Quijarro Province in the east.

The province extends over 240 km from east to west and 180 km from north to south.

Geography
The province is situated in the salt flats of the southern Altiplano, more than 65% of the province being covered by Salar de Uyuni. Salar de Uyuni is situated at an average level of 3,657 m amsl, the highest point of the province is Tutuni (Alto Totoni) (5,740 m) in the Cordillera Sillaguay on the Chilean border. The climate is that of an arid high mountain region, with yearly precipitation of below 200 mm, even less than 100 mm in the extreme west. Average daily temperatures are 0 to 5 °C all over the year.

Some of the highest mountains of the province are listed below:

Division
The province comprises two municipalities which are partly further subdivided into cantons.

Population
The main language of the province is Spanish, spoken by 80%, while 59% of the population speak Aymara. The population increased from 4,630 inhabitants (1992 census) to 5,067 (2001 census), an increase of 9.4%.

87% of the population have no access to electricity, 91% have no sanitary facilities. 73% of the population are employed in agriculture, 3% in mining, 2% in industry, 22% in general services. 87% of the population are Catholics, 8% Protestants.

The people are predominantly indigenous citizens of Aymara descent.

Places of interest 
 Salar de Uyuni with the rocky outcrops of Inkawasi and Isla del Pescado which are situated within the province

References 

Population data (Spanish)

 

Provinces of Potosí Department